Mark Stuart Williams (born 28 September 1970) is a former professional footballer who played as a defender for Shrewsbury Town, Chesterfield, Watford, Wimbledon, Stoke City, Milton Keynes Dons and Rushden & Diamonds.

Born in England, Williams played international football for Northern Ireland, being selected 36 times.

Club career
Williams started his career at Newtown, then moved to Shrewsbury Town where in 1993–94 season he helped the side win the Third Division title. After three seasons with the Shrews he moved to Chesterfield. In the 1996–97 season, he was part of Chesterfield's historic run to the FA Cup semi final, playing in both the semi final and semi final replay against Middlesbrough. Williams had earlier kick started their memorable cup run when he scored the only goal in the first round against Bury.

In 1999, he was signed by newly promoted Premier League side Watford. He scored once for Watford, his goal coming in a 2–1 defeat to Leeds United. However, at the end of the season the Hornets were relegated outright, in bottom place with just 24 points and Williams moved to another relegated side Wimbledon. Although an integral part of the team in his first season, he lost his place and joined Stoke City in March 2003. Stoke were in deep relegation trouble in 2002–03 and Williams played in six matches helping them to avoid the drop on the final day of the season. In the summer of 2003 he moved to the United States to play for Major League Soccer team Columbus Crew where he made five appearances before returning to England.

Williams re-joined old club Wimbledon in February 2004 and played 11 times for the club in 2003–04 as they suffered relegation to League One. He stayed at the club following their controversial change to Milton Keynes Dons and played 15 times for the re-branded club before ending his career with seven games on loan at Rushden & Diamonds.

International career
Williams played for Northern Ireland between 1999 and 2005 and won 36 caps, scoring once.

Personal life
In 2006, Williams married glamour model and pornographic actress Linsey Dawn McKenzie. The couple have one child, Luca Scott Mark Williams, born in May 2005. Mark also has a daughter Chardae from a previous relationship.

In November 2016, amid the United Kingdom football sexual abuse scandal, Williams waived his right to anonymity and alleged he had been abused by youth coach Barry Bennell while a trainee at Crewe. In Manchester on 5 December 2016, Williams was one of five abuse victims at the launch of an organisation, the Offside Trust, to support player victims of abuse and their families.

Career statistics

Club

International

Honours
 Shrewsbury Town
 Football League Third Division champions: 1993–94

References

External links

Northern Ireland profile

1970 births
Living people
Association footballers from Northern Ireland
English footballers
Northern Ireland international footballers
Association football defenders
Premier League players
Major League Soccer players
Newtown A.F.C. players
Shrewsbury Town F.C. players
Chesterfield F.C. players
Watford F.C. players
Wimbledon F.C. players
Stoke City F.C. players
Milton Keynes Dons F.C. players
Rushden & Diamonds F.C. players
Columbus Crew players
People from Stalybridge
English Football League players
English expatriate sportspeople in the United States
Expatriate soccer players in the United States
English expatriate footballers